Stenvall is a surname. Notable people with the surname include:

Alexis Stenvall (1834–1872), birth name of Finnish author Aleksis Kivi
Kaj Stenvall (born 1951), Finnish artist 
Selm Stenvall (1914–1995), Swedish cross-country skier 

Surnames of Scandinavian origin